"Someone Else" is a song by Dutch singer Duncan Laurence. It was released as a digital download on 13 May 2020 by Spark Records as the third single from his debut studio album Small Town Boy, the song also features on his debut EP Worlds on Fire. The song was written by Brett McLaughlin, Bram Inscore, Jonny Price, Duncan Laurence and PJ Harding.

Background
Talking about the song, Laurence said: "'Someone Else' is about the feeling you can get when you're all by yourself and your head starts spinning and replaying memories of a previous relationship. [...] Where you normally find comfort and distraction in your daily life, these days you are confronted almost every minute with those thoughts".

Live performances
On 16 May 2020, Laurence performed the song live on Eurovision: Europe Shine a Light. It replaced the Eurovision Song Contest 2020, which was planned to be held in Rotterdam, Netherlands, but was cancelled due to the COVID-19 pandemic. The show was broadcast live from Hilversum, Netherlands.

Personnel
Credits adapted from Tidal.
 Bram Inscore – Producer, composer, lyricist, associated performer, bass guitar, drum programming, guitar, keyboards, piano, wurlitzer organ
 Brett McLaughlin – Producer, composer, lyricist, associated performer, background vocalist, engineer, studio personnel
 Duncan Laurence – Composer, lyricist, associated performer, background vocalist, vocals
 Jonny Price – Composer, lyricist 
 PJ Harding – Composer, lyricist 
 Cenzo Townshend – Mixer, studio personnel

Charts

Weekly charts

Year-end charts

References

2020 singles
2020 songs
Duncan Laurence songs
Songs written by Leland (musician)
Songs written by Duncan Laurence